McCarthy Trenching is a band from Omaha, Nebraska led by Dan McCarthy. The band has opened for other acts such as Bright Eyes. In 2013 the McCarthy Trenching song "A Keg of Beer and an Accordion" was named one of Music Times' "Best '_ and Beer' Songs".

Discography
Old Habits (2003) (demo)
It's Got Nothing to Do with the Drinking (2006) (demo)
McCarthy Trenching (2007)
Calamity Drenching (2008)
"Fresh Blood" (2011)
"Plays The Piano" (2012)
"More Like It" (2015)

References

External links
 

Rock music groups from Nebraska
Team Love Records artists